Chisnall is a surname. Notable people with the surname include:

Dave Chisnall (born 1980), English darts player
David Chisnall (1948–2013), English rugby league player
Eric Chisnall (born 1946), English rugby league player
Peter Chisnall (born 1949), Australian rules footballer
Phil Chisnall (1942–2021), English footballer